Minarelli is an Italian motorcycle engine manufacturer. It is part of the Fantic Motor group.

History 
Minarelli was founded in Bologna in 1951 as a motorcycle manufacturer.  In 1954 it also began to build mopeds.  Two years later Minarelli switched exclusively to 2-stroke engine manufacture and a new 2000 square metre factory was constructed for these purposes.  It employed 20 technical staff and produced 70 engines a day.  These were sold to companies in Italy, other parts of Europe and South America. 

In 1967 the company changed its name to Motori Minarelli and opened a new plant in Calderara di Reno.   By the 1970s engine production had reached 250,000 units a year.  The company also entered motorcycle racing and won a number of titles.

In 1990 the company began a business relationship with Yamaha.  Five years later it employed 350 people and engine production had reached 450,000 units a year.  In 2002, following changes in the world motorcycle market, Motori Minarelli became a member of the Yamaha Group.

In 2020 Fantic Motor acquired 100% of the shares from Yamaha.

Gallery

References

Moped manufacturers
Motorcycle manufacturers of Italy
Manufacturing companies based in Bologna
Transport in Italy
Yamaha Corporation

nl:FBM
Motorcycle engine manufacturers